Say Salaam India is an 2007 Indian Hindi language sports drama film, written and directed by Subhash Kapoor, and starring Sanjay Suri, Milind Soman, Anuj Pandit Sharma, and Sandhya Mridul. The film revolves around a group of four boys and their passion for the sport.

Plot
The film begins by introducing four boys, Viru, Mahi, Shakeel and Guri, and how they fight their circumstances and lack of resources to pursue their love of cricket. Meanwhile, in the elite Royal Heritage School in the state capital, a cricket coach Hari Sadu has the task of coaching the school team to win their sixth state championship, but faces opposition to his coaching methods by players on the team, who are talented but unwilling to work hard to improve. This leads to tension between the coach and players, which leads to Hari Sadu being wrongfully accused and fired by the board of members, replaced by Harry Oberoi, a suave fixer from the cricket world who suits the image and profile of the school.

Hari Sadu is determined to make a local team to compete at the Inter-School Challenge, with the help of his wife Sonali and his cerebral palsy-suffering son Rustam. He develops a cricketing eleven from the wrestling team at the local corporation school, overcoming various hurdles to take on the Royal Heritage School at the Inter-School Challenge. The boys come from humble backgrounds and limited resources but have a passion for cricket and natural talent.

Cast
Mandar Jadhav as Viru
Sanjay Suri as Hari Sadu
Milind Soman as Harry Oberoi
Sandhya Mridul as Sonali
 Sachin Khedekar as Gossy
 Manoj Pahwa as Surinder Huda
Madhur Mittal as Shakeel
Anuj Pandit Sharma as Guri
Vinay Pathak
Aditya Seal as Siddharth
Ojas Bavishi as Rustum

Soundtrack
"Chaal Murkhiyon Waali" — Labh Janjua
"Chaal Murkhiyon Waali" (Remix) — Labh Janjua
"Haiya Haiya" — Naresh Iyer
"Kainthewala" — Bill Singh
"Kamli" — Jaspinder Narula
"Tana Re Bana Re" (Female) — Shubha Mudgal
"Tana Re Bana Re" (Male) — Sonu Nigam
"Tana Re Bana Re" (Male Remix) — Sonu Nigam

References

External links
 
 Say Salaam India Bollywood Hungama

2007 films
2000s Hindi-language films
Films about cricket in India
Films directed by Subhash Kapoor